Ghatigaon railway station is a railway station on Indore–Gwalior line under the Bhopal railway division of West Central Railway zone. This is situated beside National Highway 3 at Ghatigaon in Gwalior district of the Indian state of Madhya Pradesh.

References

Railway stations in Gwalior district
Bhopal railway division